Rameswaram is a 2007 Indian Tamil-language romantic drama film directed by S. Selvam and produced by S. N. Raja. Jiiva and Bhavana play lead roles while Lal, Bose Venkat, Manivannan, and Karunas play supporting roles.  The shooting of the film finished in September 2007, with shooting locations were canned in India and in Sri Lanka, for the picturization of a portion. The film released worldwide on 30 November 2007 and met with mixed reviews and did not do very well commercially.

Plot
Vasanthi is the daughter of a man who assists refugees. She instantly falls for Jeevan, a Tamil refugee staying in the camp in Rameswaram. Jeevan dreams of returning to his homeland, and discourages her, but he falls in love with her anyway. Vasanthi's cousin, who want to marry her, enters the story. He joins as an inspector in the local police station. The whole family is eagerly awaiting their marriage. Problems arise when the family discover the relationship. Vasanthi's cousin and his uncle try to eliminate Jeevan. They keep on troubling him, without much success. Meanwhile, the refugees are allowed to return, and Jeevan has to go with them. He promises Vasanthi to return to marry her. The family is determined to stop him. Vasanthi decides to end her life if Jeevan does not turn up.

Cast
Jiiva as Shivandha Raja @ Jeevan
Bhavana as Vasanthi
Lal as Vasanthi's father
Bose Venkat as Vasanthi's cousin
Manivannan as Jeevan's grandfather
Karunas
Sampath Raj
Sampath Ram as a refugee

Production
Jiiva and Gopika were signed on to work on the film in December 2005, with reports suggesting that the film would be based on the refuge crisis affecting Sri Lankan emigrants in Rameswaram. Selvam, an erstwhile assistant to director Pavithran, made his directorial debut through the venture.

Soundtrack 
The film has 5 songs and one theme music. The lyrics of the song "Ellorayum Ethipoga" are very meaningful. "Alaigalin Osai", "Naan Tharai Nila" and "Yedho Senja" songs will be likened by music listeners.

Reviews
Indiaglitz wrote: "Director Selvam has tried or pretended to try to deal with the love story in the backdrop of the refugees' plight. He has miserably failed to convincingly combine the two. The backdrop doesn't add any dimension to the predictable silly love story and the love track doesn't provide any relief to the serious issue of refugees. The script hasn't justified the handling of the refugee issue. The tame love story fails to kindle any interest. As a result, the movie ends up as a predictable and dull fare". Behindwoods wrote:"What could have been a memorable movie watching experience is reduced to a mere time pass, courtesy the run of the mill plot, only with a different backdrop". Sify wrote:"Rameswaram is a half-baked venture and is a major let down".  Hindu wrote:"‘Rameswaram’ has laudable technical assistance holding aloft a love line that’s run-of-the-mill".

References

External links
 

2007 romantic drama films
2007 films
2000s Tamil-language films
Indian romantic drama films
Films shot in Tamil Nadu
2009 directorial debut films
2009 films